Celedón is a surname of Spanish origin, a variant of Zeledón.

People with the name
 Claudia Celedón (born 1966), Chilean actress
 Jorge Celedón (born 1968), Colombian musician
 Luis Celedón (born 1926), Chilean long-distance runner
 Rafael Celedón (born 1979), Chilean footballer

See also
 Celedón, a symbol of the villager native of Álava, Spain
 Celadon (disambiguation)

References

Surnames of Spanish origin